Dave Cheatham is an American politician and former educator who served as a member of the Indiana House of Representatives for the 69th district from 1984 to 1992 and again from 2006 to 2012.

References

External links
Indiana State Legislature - Representative Dave Cheatham Official government website
Project Vote Smart - Representative David 'Dave' Cheatham (IN) profile
Follow the Money - Dave Cheatham
2008 2006 campaign contributions

Democratic Party members of the Indiana House of Representatives
Living people
1951 births